Motorama is a 1991 American black comedy road movie about a 10-year-old boy who drives a 1965 Mustang across a fictional landscape. The film features cameos by Drew Barrymore, Flea, Jack Nance, Robert Picardo, Martha Quinn, and Meat Loaf. It was directed by Barry Shills and written by Joseph Minion, screenwriter of After Hours, who Shills also worked with for Vampire's Kiss. In 2000, Barrymore reprised her role as Fantasy Girl for the film Skipped Parts.

Plot
A ten-year-old runaway boy named Gus takes a road trip for the purpose of collecting game piece cards from gas stations in order to spell out the word M-O-T-O-R-A-M-A for a supposed grand prize of $500 million. The film is set in a darkly comedic alternate world full of a grotesque and bizarre collection of people and places.

After a night of hearing his parents fight about the possibility of another mouth to feed, Gus a preteen boy, decides to cash out his piggy bank and take off in a stolen Ford Mustang. His plan is to collect all the MOTORAMA cards across the country, in order to claim the grand prize, which will set him up for a promising future. The cards are only available at specific, participating gas stations.

Stopping at a diner he is able to convince the patrons that he is an adult, and for the rest of the movie everyone he encounters treats him as an adult, despite him clearly being a child. At a gas station he indirectly causes an attendant to be hit by a truck, mostly due to the attendant’s own stupidity and carelessness.

Staying the night at a motel, Gus encounters the curious, squirrel obsessed owner, who kills any squirrels he catches with exhaust fumes. Leaving the next day and running low on money he decides to steal some gas. However an unstable couple catch and knock him out damaging his eye socket. Instead of allowing surgical repair they decline an operation. That night in the mote it is implied that the couple rape him off screen. The next morning Gus dresses and leaves, only to find on his a decrepit Motorama Billboard making him question his whole journey.

In low spirits and with no apparent way of finding more money or gas, he stops for food. Now wearing an eye patch over his lost eye, a biker identifies him as a pirate and challenges him to arm wrestle for money. Gus loses. After a dispute of cheating and revelations about his quest, the bikers humiliate him by branding him with a demeaning tattoo.

Stopped at a rest stop, still desperate for money, he gambles with a father over a game of horseshoes. The father then decides to take this as a chance to abandon his children, and he and his wife take off. The children look on aimlessly as their parents drive away.

His journey nears completion with just one letter remaining. He drives onward, through a dark and menacing industrial park, where people fight, burn crosses, and take drugs. On an empty, rain soaked highway he swerves to avoid a truck and drives his car off an unfinished bridge, damaging it so he can no longer drive.

Walking back along the road he encounters an older version of himself, driven crazy by the fact that he never found one last letter, the same one Gus is missing. Gus comes across a mentally handicapped gas station attendee and buys gas, only to receive just one card in return. Fortunately it turns out to be the final letter he needs. His hair now gray, and viewed by everyone in the world as an old man, he heads off to the company offices to claim his prize.

At the company headquarters, a representative explains over the phone in the lobby that collecting all the letters doesn't make him a prize winner, rather just eligible for the prize. Not giving up, he heads upstairs and tries to meet with the company executives, but only gets as far as the secretary. Everyone now sees him as the small child he is, and treats him as such. The secretary explains that nobody is supposed to win Motorama. She congratulates him on collecting the letter, but tells him that there will be no prize. In a fury he realizes too late he's been deceived. A security guard throws him out of the high skyscraper window.

He lands in a pool of water, and then emerges from the same river that he stopped at after the first diner. His car is good as new, and waiting for him on the dusty road. His health is also restored; his eye is back, his tattoo is gone. He throws away the metal leg extensions he made to enable him to drive the car and hitchhikes back towards home. En route he finds the attendee Phil from the first gas station has survived being hit by the truck, but is severely injured. Lacking other options, Gus decides to stay at the gas station and work there to aid Phil. He is now back to being viewed as an adult, despite still being a child.

In a final scene, Gus fills up the car of a gambler who claims to have just won a million dollars. He opens the trunk to show the cash to Gus. The gambler drives away, only to die from the same horrific accident Phil endured, hitting a truck head-on. Letting go of hopes of any financial success and his fantasy girl, Gus remains at the desolate gas station with Phil, staring into the middle distance, continuing to wait for some success down the road.

Cast
 Martha Quinn as Bank Teller
 Flea as Busboy
 Michael J. Pollard as Lou
 Meat Loaf as Vern
 Drew Barrymore as Fantasy Girl
 Garrett Morris as Andy
 Jordan Christopher Michael as Gus
 Susan Tyrrell as The Bartender
 Mary Woronov as Kidnapping Wife
 Allyce Beasley as Chimera Receptionist
 Robin Duke as Miss Lawton
 Shelley Berman as Million Dollar Driver
 Jack Nance as Motel Clerk
 John Laughlin as Man At Wagon Wheel
 Dick Miller as Father In The Woods
 John Diehl as Phil
 Robert Picardo as Jerry
 Charles Tyner as Dying Man
 Sandy Baron as Kidnapping Husband
 Paul Willson as Cook

Production
Filming took place in and around Page, Arizona, Lake Powell, Glen Canyon, Utah and the Fox Studio Lot in Century City, Los Angeles, California.

References

External links

 
 
 

1990s adventure comedy films
1990s road movies
1991 comedy films
1991 films
American adventure comedy films
American road movies
Films shot in Arizona
Films shot in Utah
1990s English-language films
1990s American films